Mehrnoosh "Nooshi" Dadgostar (born 20 June 1985) is a Swedish politician, a member of the Riksdag since 2014, deputy chair of the Left Party from 2018 to 2020, and the chair since 2020.

Career

2020–present: Left Party leadership 
On 3 February 2020, Dadgostar announced that she would be running for leader of her party following the resignation of Jonas Sjöstedt. In late September 2020, Dadgostar was officially nominated as the party's new leader, and on 31 October she was elected leader of the Left Party.

In mid-June 2021, she threatened to seek a vote of no-confidence in Stefan Löfven's premiership after the government announced its intention to relax rent control laws in Sweden. On 15 June, she issued a 48-hour ultimatum to the government to either withdraw its plans or have the Left Party withdrawing from the governing coalition. Dadgostar followed through by pulling the Left Party out from their passive support, resulting in a chamber vote where the Riksdag voted Löfven out of power.

Personal life 
Her parents moved to Sweden as refugees from Iran to escape persecution in the early 1980s. She grew up in Gothenburg. She studied law at Stockholm University, although without finishing her degree.

References

External links

1985 births
Members of the Riksdag from the Left Party (Sweden)
Left Party (Sweden) MEPs
Living people
Swedish socialists
People from Ängelholm Municipality
Swedish people of Iranian descent
Swedish politicians of Iranian descent
Members of the Riksdag 2014–2018
Members of the Riksdag 2018–2022
Members of the Riksdag 2022–2026
21st-century Swedish women politicians
Women members of the Riksdag